The 1992 World Rally Championship was the 20th season of the FIA World Rally Championship. The season consisted of 14 rallies. Carlos Sainz won his second drivers' world championship in a Toyota Celica GT-Four ST185, ahead of Juha Kankkunen and Didier Auriol. The manufacturers' title was won by Lancia, ahead of Toyota and Ford.

Teams and drivers

Results and standings

Manufacturers' championship

Drivers' championship

Events

See also 
 1992 in sports

External links 

 FIA World Rally Championship 1992 at ewrc-results.com

World Rally Championship
World Rally Championship seasons